Charles Ross (1799–1860), was a British politician, Member of Parliament for  (1822-1826),  (1826-1832) and  (1832-1837).

Life
He was the son of Alexander Ross, Surveyor-General of the Ordnance and Isabella Barbara Evelyn Gunning, daughter of Sir Robert Gunning, 1st Baronet.

He was nominated at Orford by the 3rd Marquess of Hertford for the constituency of Orford, after Castlereagh's suicide, and became a solid Tory Member of Parliament, to 1837. He also served as a Civil Lord of the Admiralty from 1830 to 1832, as one of the Lords Commissioners of the Treasury 1834-1835 and as a Commissioner of Audit from 1849 until his death on 21 March 1860.

Ross is buried at Kensal Green Cemetery, London.

References

1799 births
1860 deaths
Burials at Kensal Green Cemetery
Conservative Party (UK) MPs for English constituencies
Members of the Parliament of the United Kingdom for constituencies in Cornwall
MPs for rotten boroughs
Tory MPs (pre-1834)
UK MPs 1820–1826
UK MPs 1826–1830
UK MPs 1830–1831
UK MPs 1831–1832
UK MPs 1832–1835
UK MPs 1835–1837
Lords of the Admiralty